The Minister-President of Brandenburg is the head of government of the German state of Brandenburg. The office was created in 1990 after the German reunification and the joining of Brandenburg in the Federal Republic of Germany. The current and third Minister-President is Dietmar Woidke, heading a coalition government between the Social Democrats, the CDU and the Alliance '90/The Greens. Woidke succeeded Matthias Platzeck in August 2013.

The Minister-President's seat of government is known as the State Chancellery and is located in the state capital, Potsdam, along with the other cabinet department.

List 
Political party:

See also
Brandenburg
Politics of Brandenburg
Landtag of Brandenburg

List
Brandenburg
Ministers-President
Ministers-President